Vallées-d'Antraigues-Asperjoc is a commune in the Ardèche department in southern France. The municipality was established on 1 January 2019 by merger of the former communes of Antraigues-sur-Volane and Asperjoc.

See also
Communes of the Ardèche department

References

Communes of Ardèche

Communes nouvelles of Ardèche
Populated places established in 2019
2019 establishments in France